Alex Veadov is an American film and television actor of Ukrainian-Jewish ancestry.

Career
Alex Veadov is a character actor who has acted in many English-language productions. His early career included appearances in Jackie Chan's First Strike, Contact, and Air Force One. He also works as a voice actor.

Veadov is known for playing Russian mob drug lord and hitman Vadim Nezhinski in the film We Own the Night.

Veadov also played the role of Christo, a drug smuggler and terrorist seeking to attack the United States, in the 2012 movie Act of Valor.

In 2014, Veadov played the role of Tevi in The Equalizer. In 2015, he portrayed Nikola in the television series ''Agent Carter.

Filmography

Film

Television

Video games

References

External links
 

Living people
American male film actors
20th-century American Jews
Soviet Jews
American people of Russian-Jewish descent
American people of Ukrainian-Jewish descent
American male television actors
Male actors from New York City
Russian male film actors
Russian male television actors
21st-century American Jews
Year of birth missing (living people)